Adriano Vieira de Lima, (born 30 July 1981 in São Paulo) is a Brazilian retired footballer who last played for Los Angeles Blues in the USL Professional Division.

Career

Youth and amateur
Adriano de Lima played in many youth clubs in Brazil, including Itaguá and Pequeninos do Jóquei, Sport Club Corinthians Paulista Sub-16 team, and briefly played professionally in Brazil for Itaguá, before moving to the United States in 1999 to play college soccer at Cypress College in Cypress, California. He transferred to California State University, Fullerton in 2001, and played three more seasons there.

Professional
After playing professional indoor soccer for the San Diego Sockers in the MISL in 2003, De Lima returned to Brazil to join Flamengo. After returning to the United States, Adriano de Lima played professional beach soccer for SoCal Beach in Oceanside, California, and in 2007 participated in the Futsal World Club Championship in the Algarve in Portugal for World United.

Adriano de Lima signed with the Los Angeles Blues in the USL Professional Division in 2011; he made his debut for the Blues on May 1, 2011 in a 1-0 defeat to Antigua Barracuda

Personal
Adriano De Lima coaches soccer and owns Culture FC Sports, a sports travel company that provides soccer players and teams with opportunities in Brazil and U.S.

Adriano de Lima was also part of the Nike skills team as a sponsored athlete, promoting and helping develop the game in the United States. He traveled all over the country and the world as an ambassador of the sport, entertaining and influencing soccer players of all ages and levels. He also participated in many soccer ads and campaigns, and in the video game FIFA Street 2.

References

External links
 Culture FC Sports
 So Cal Beach F.C.
 Los Angeles Blues Soccer Club
 USL Pro

1981 births
Living people
Brazilian footballers
Cal State Fullerton Titans men's soccer players
Orange County SC players
USL Championship players
Footballers from São Paulo
Association football midfielders